Glaucocharis maculosa is a moth in the family Crambidae. It was described by Graziano Bassi and Wolfram Mey in 2011. It is found in South Africa.

References

Diptychophorini
Moths described in 2011